Michael Patrick Boatman (born October 25, 1964) is an American actor and writer. He is known for his roles as New York City mayoral aide Carter Heywood in the ABC sitcom Spin City, as U.S. Army Specialist Samuel Beckett in the ABC drama series China Beach, as 101st Airborne soldier Motown in the Vietnam War movie Hamburger Hill, and as sports agent Stanley Babson in the HBO sitcom Arli$$. He also starred in The Good Fight, the Paramount+ spinoff of The Good Wife.

Early life and education
Boatman was born in Colorado Springs, Colorado, the son of Gwendolyn Boatman Pugh, a job supervisor for the disabled, and Daniel Boatman, an army officer. He was raised in Chicago. Boatman is a graduate of Western Illinois University and received its "Alumni Achievement Award" in 1997.

Boatman studied acting at Western Illinois University, where he played a variety of roles including Oberon in A Midsummer Night's Dream, and Purlie in Purlie Victorious. He was a member of the student sketch comedy troupe Shock Treatment, which performed at local bars and nightclubs. During his senior year Boatman won the prestigious Irene Ryan theater award for best supporting actor during the finals competition at the Kennedy Center.

Acting career

In 1986, Boatman moved to Chicago, where he studied acting with Jane Brody, a popular acting teacher and casting director. Later that same year, he auditioned for and won the role of "Motown" in the critically acclaimed Vietnam action drama, Hamburger Hill. That same year he appeared in Running on Empty with River Phoenix, and The Trial of Bernard Goetz for the PBS American Playhouse series. In 1988, he auditioned for the pilot episode of the Vietnam era television drama, China Beach. He went on to play Samuel Beckett, the mortician in the China Beach mortuary, for the next three seasons. He later co-starred on The Jackie Thomas Show with Tom Arnold, and the short-lived WB series Muscle. In 1996, he landed a role on the ABC sitcom, Spin City, playing Carter Heywood, the irascible, openly gay minority affairs liaison. For his work on Spin City he was nominated for five NAACP Image Awards for Best Supporting Actor in a Comedy. He also won the GLAAD (Gay and Lesbian Association Against Defamation) award for Best Actor.

At the same time he was on Spin City, Boatman played the role of Stanley Babson, the anal-retentive chief financial officer on the HBO original series Arliss and starred on both series simultaneously until they were canceled in 2002. For his work on Arliss Boatman was nominated for four Image Awards, also for Best Supporting Actor. He played the lead role in the critically acclaimed Charles Burnett drama, The Glass Shield. Later, he appeared in the feature films The Peacemaker, with George Clooney and Nicole Kidman, and Woman Thou Art Loosed, and in several made-for-TV movies. Michael Boatman also narrated in the WPA slave narratives in the HBO film Unchained Memories, in 2003.

In 2007, Boatman co-starred in the feature films, The Killing of Wendy (2008), American Summer and My Father's Will. He has had many notable guest appearances, including five episodes of Law & Order: Special Victims Unit, Less Than Perfect, Yes, Dear, Scrubs, CSI: Miami, Hannah Montana  and Grey's Anatomy. Boatman guest starred in the mystery/drama Warehouse 13, in July 2009.

In 2009, he joined the cast of the Lifetime comedy series Sherri, starring Sherri Shepherd. The series is based on Shepherd's life experiences as a divorced single mom, actress and stand-up comedian. Boatman plays Doctor Randy Gregg, Sherri's son's pediatrician and Sherri's love interest.

More recently he has appeared as attorney Julius Cain in The Good Wife. In 2011, Boatman guest-starred as Russell Thorpe on Gossip Girl, along with Tika Sumpter, who played his daughter Raina. In 2012, Boatman became a recurring character in the FX original series Anger Management, reuniting with his former Spin City co-star Charlie Sheen as Sheen's next door neighbor Michael. Beginning in late September 2013, he began co-starring in Nick at Nite's new series Instant Mom, alongside Tia Mowry-Hardrict. In 2016 Boatman recurred on the CBS All Access drama The Good Fight, reprising the role of attorney Julius Cain, the character he played on The Good Wife. He was promoted to series regular in the second season.

Writing
Boatman is also a screenwriter and novelist. He sometimes writes in the splatterpunk horror genre. Joe R. Lansdale praised his first collection with "Michael Boatman writes like a visitor from hell. Someone out on short term leave for bad behavior. I love this stuff. He's one of the new, and more than promising, writers making his mark, and a dark and wonderful mark it is."

Many multi-author anthologies feature at least one of his short stories. They include Sick Things: An Anthology of Extreme Creature Horror, Until Someone Loses an Eye, Sages and Swords, Badass Horror and Christmas in Hell and Dominion: An Anthology of Speculative Fiction From Africa and the African Diaspora. He has been published in Weird Tales, Horror Garage and Red Scream. He introduced Cyber-Pulp Halloween 3.0 which was published by Cyber-pulp Books. His Born Again from Eulogies II: Tales From the Cellar received an Honorable Mention from Ellen Datlow in The Best Horror of the Year: Volume Six. His first collection of short stories, God Laughs When You Die, was published by Dybbuk Press on October 23, 2007. His humorous horror novel, The Revenant Road'', was published by Drollerie Press in 2009.

Filmography

Film

Television

References

External links

Michael Boatman Biography on Starpulse.com, Retrieved on March 22, 2007
 God Laughs When You Blog (dormant since 2008)
 Michael Boatman's Official Website (archived)

1964 births
Living people
African-American male actors
American people of Saint Kitts and Nevis descent
American male film actors
American horror writers
American male television actors
Male actors from Colorado Springs, Colorado
Participants in American reality television series
Writers from Colorado Springs, Colorado
Splatterpunk
People from Macomb, Illinois
Western Illinois University alumni
21st-century African-American people
20th-century African-American people